Henry Bicknell (4 February 1903 – 7 July 1978) was a Jamaican cricketer. He played in two first-class matches for the Jamaican cricket team in 1926/27.

See also
 List of Jamaican representative cricketers

References

External links
 

1903 births
1978 deaths
Jamaican cricketers
Jamaica cricketers
Sportspeople from Kingston, Jamaica